Håkan Malmström (born 16 July 1977) is a Swedish footballer. He was a defender in the Swedish football club IF Brommapojkarna. He came to Brommapojkarna in the 2004 season, previously he has played for Segeltorps IF and Spårvägens FF. He also played for Norwegian team Hamarkameratene in the 2008 and 2009 seasons.

External links

1977 births
Living people
Association football central defenders
Swedish footballers
IF Brommapojkarna players
Hamarkameratene players
Expatriate footballers in Norway
Swedish expatriate footballers
Swedish expatriate sportspeople in Norway
Eliteserien players
Association football defenders